Thomas Hayward (by 1507–1534), of Ipswich, Suffolk, was an English politician.

He was a Member of Parliament (MP) for Ipswich in 1529.

References

1534 deaths
Members of the Parliament of England (pre-1707) for Ipswich
English MPs 1529–1536
Year of birth uncertain